David Scott Gaunson (3 September 1879 – 7 March 1946) was an Australian rules footballer who played with St Kilda in the Victorian Football League (VFL).

References

External links 

1879 births
1946 deaths
Australian rules footballers from Victoria (Australia)
St Kilda Football Club players
People educated at Melbourne Grammar School